The Copa Chile 1994 was the 24th edition of the Chilean Cup tournament. The competition started on March 5, 1994, and concluded on August 24, 1994. Colo-Colo won the competition for their fourth time, beating O'Higgins on penalties in the final.

Calendar

Group Round

Group 1

Intergroup scores (groups 1-2)

Group 2

Group 3

Intergroup scores (groups 3-4)

Group 4

Group 5

Group 6

Second round

|}

Quarterfinals

|}

Semifinals

Final

Top goalscorers
Alejandro Glaría (Cobreloa) 12 goals
Marcelo Salas (U. de Chile) 12 goals

See also
 1994 Campeonato Nacional
 Primera B

References
Revista Don Balon (Santiago, Chile) March–August 1994 (revised scores & information)
RSSSF (secondary source)

Copa Chile
Chile
1994